The 2011 FIFA Women's World Cup qualification UEFA Group 4 was a UEFA qualifying group for the 2011 FIFA Women's World Cup. The group comprised Ukraine, Poland, Hungary, Romania and Bosnia and Herzegovina.

Ukraine advanced to the play-off rounds after winning the group.

Standings

Results

Goalscorers
7 goals
  Agnieszka Winczo
4 goals
  Cosmina Duşa
3 goals

  Agata Tarczyńska
  Patrycja Pożerska
  Lyudmyla Pekur

2 goals

  Anita Pádár
  Rita Méry
  Ewa Żyła
  Andreea Laiu
  Daryna Apanaschenko
  Tetyana Chorna

1 goal

  Fanny Vagó
  Gabriella Tóth
  Lilla Krenács
  Zsanett Jakabfi
  Anna Żelazko
  Donata Leśnik
  Marta Stobba
  Elena Pavel
  Florentina Spânu
  Laura Roxana Rus
  Raluca Sarghe
  Stefania Iuliana Vatafu
  Olena Khodyreva
  Vera Djatel

External links
 Regulations of the European Qualifying Competition for the 6th FIFA Women's World Cup

4
2009–10 in Ukrainian football
2010–11 in Ukrainian football
2009–10 in Bosnia and Herzegovina football
2010–11 in Bosnia and Herzegovina football
2009–10 in Hungarian football
2010–11 in Hungarian football
2009–10 in Romanian football
2010–11 in Romanian football
2009–10 in Polish football
2010–11 in Polish football